"Women and children first", known to a lesser extent as the Birkenhead drill, is a code of conduct whereby the lives of women and children were to be saved first in a life-threatening situation, typically abandoning ship, when survival resources such as lifeboats were limited. However, it has no basis in maritime law.

In the 19th and 20th centuries, "women and children first" was seen as a chivalric ideal. The concept "was celebrated among Victorian and Edwardian commentators as a long-standing practice – a 'tradition', 'law of human nature', 'the ancient chivalry of the sea', 'handed down in the race'."  Its practise was featured in accounts of some 18th-century shipwrecks with greater public awareness during the 19th century. Notable invocations of the concept include during the 1852 evacuation of the Royal Navy troopship  and most famously during the 1912 sinking of RMS Titanic. Despite its prominence in the popular imagination, the doctrine was unevenly applied. The use of "women and children first" during the Birkenhead evacuation was a "celebrated exception", used to establish a tradition of English chivalry during the second half of the 19th century.

According to one expert, in modern-day evacuations people will usually help the most vulnerabletypically those injured, elderly or very young childrento escape first.

History

19th century

 
The first documented application of "women and children first" was in May 1840 when, after a lightning strike, fire broke out aboard the American packet Poland en route from New York to Le Havre. According to a passenger, J.H. Buckingham of Boston:

This led to a precautionary evacuation of women, children and a few male passengers into the longboat, while the other male passengers and crew remained aboard to fight the blaze. As Buckingham was a journalist, his vivid account of the incident was published first in the Boston Courier, picked up by other papers including The Times (London) and also reprinted in a book published in the same year, thus gaining wide currency.

The phrase appeared prominently in the 1860 novel Harrington: A Story of True Love, by William Douglas O'Connor, during the recounting of the death of Captain Harrington, the father of the eponymous character John Harrington. Captain Harrington's fictional death illustrates not only the concept of "women and children first" but also that of "the captain goes down with his ship".

During the nineteenth and early twentieth centuries, ships typically did not carry enough lifeboats to save all the passengers and crew in the event of disaster. In 1870, answering a question at the House of Commons of the United Kingdom about the sinking of the paddle steamer Normandy, George Shaw-Lefevre said that,

The practise of women and children gained widespread currency following the actions of soldiers during the sinking of the Royal Navy troopship  in 1852 after it struck rocks. Captain Robert Salmond RN ordered Colonel Seton to send men to the chain pumps; sixty were directed to this task, sixty more were assigned to the tackles of the lifeboats, and the rest were assembled on the poop deck in order to raise the forward part of the ship. The women and children were placed in the ship's cutter, which lay alongside. The sinking was memorialized in newspapers and paintings of the time, and in poems such as Rudyard Kipling's 1893 "Soldier an' Sailor Too".

20th century
By the turn of the 20th century, larger ships meant more people could travel, but regulations were generally still insufficient to provide for all passengers: for example British legislation concerning the number of lifeboats was based on the tonnage of a vessel and only encompassed vessels of "10,000 gross tons and over". The result was that a sinking usually involved a moral dilemma for passengers and crew as to whose lives should be saved with the limited available lifeboats.

The Second Officer suggested to Captain Smith, "Hadn't we better get the women and children into the boats, sir?", to which the captain responded: "put the women and children in and lower away". The First and Second officers (William McMaster Murdoch and Charles Lightoller) interpreted the evacuation order differently; Murdoch took it to mean women and children first, while Lightoller took it to mean women and children only. Second Officer Lightoller lowered lifeboats with empty seats if there were no women and children waiting to board, while First Officer Murdoch allowed a limited number of men to board if all the nearby women and children had embarked. As a consequence, 74% of the women and 52% of the children on board were saved, but only 20% of the men. Some officers on the Titanic misinterpreted the order from Captain Smith, and tried to prevent men from boarding the lifeboats. It was intended that women and children would board first, with any remaining free spaces for men. Because not all women and children were saved on the Titanic, the few men who survived, like White Star official J. Bruce Ismay, were initially branded as cowards.

21st century
There is no legal basis for the protocol of women and children first in international maritime law.

In the Boy Scouts of America's Sea Scouting program, "Women and children first" was considered "the motto of the sea" and was part of the Sea Promise until 2020.

See also 
 Ida Straus – a passenger aboard the Titanic
 Male expendability
 SS Arctic disaster, a contrary case

Footnotes

References

1852 introductions
Lifesaving
English phrases
RMS Titanic
Maritime disasters
Chivalry
Lifeboats
Maritime history
Ethics
Social philosophy
Children
Women's rights
Sexism
Quotations
1850s neologisms